Hamre (historically, Hammer) is a former municipality in the old Hordaland county, Norway. The municipality existed from 1838 until 1964 when it was dissolved and its lands split up among several other municipalities. It was located in what is now Alver Municipality and Osterøy Municipality in Vestland county. At that time, it encompassed land on both sides of the Osterfjorden on the Lindås peninsula on the north side and on the island of Osterøy on the south side. The administrative centre was the village of Hamre where Hamre Church was located.

History
The parish of Hammer was established as a municipality on 1 January 1838 (see formannskapsdistrikt law). On 1 January 1885, the northwestern district of Hamre on the island of Holsnøy and the area around the village of Alversund on the mainland (population: 2,793) was separated to become the new municipality of Alversund.  On 1 January 1904, the western district of Hamre (population: 1,625) was separated to become the new municipality of Åsane. The split left Hamre with a population of 2,914. On 1 July 1914 a part of western Hamre with 622 inhabitants was transferred to Åsane.  The spelling of the name was changed from "Hammer" to "Hamre" by a royal resolution in 1915.

During the 1960s, there were many municipal mergers across Norway due to the work of the Schei Committee. On 1 January 1964 the municipality of Hamre was dissolved and its lands were split up as follows:
the island of Flatøy (population: 166) was transferred to Meland Municipality.
the area on the northern coast of the Osterfjorden (population: 1,240) was transferred to Lindås Municipality.
the area on the island of Osterøy (population: 1,166) was merged into the new Osterøy Municipality.

Government

Municipal council
The municipal council  of Hamre was made up of 17 representatives that were elected to four year terms.  The party breakdown of the final municipal council was as follows:

See also
List of former municipalities of Norway

References

Alver (municipality)
Osterøy
Former municipalities of Norway
1838 establishments in Norway
1964 disestablishments in Norway